Donald Robert Haragen (born April 15, 1936) is an American academic. He served as president of Texas Tech University from 1996 to 2000. He is a professor in the Department of Geosciences. Haragan earned his Ph.D. at the University of Texas at Austin in 1969 in civil engineering, a master's degree in meteorology from Texas A&M University, and a Bachelor of Science degree from the University of Texas at Austin in 1969.

References

Presidents of Texas Tech University
People from Houston
Cockrell School of Engineering alumni
Texas A&M University alumni
Texas Tech University faculty
1936 births
Living people